Andre Scarlett (born 11 January 1980) is an English footballer who plays for Hanworth Villa. As well as operating in central midfield Scarlett is as equally comfortable playing right full back. He began his career in the Football League with Luton Town.

Early career

Scarlett originally joined Staines Town in December 2005 upon his release from Chesham United. Later he had spells with St Albans City (one appearance in October 2012), Metropolitan Police and Chipstead.

Later career

In late 2012 he joined Wingate & Finchley of the Isthmian League, but was not retained the following season, and joined Walton & Hersham at the beginning of the 2013–14 season. His next stop was Walton Casuals, before returning to Walton & Hersham in August. From the 2016–17 season he played for Westfield.

He registered as a player for Hanworth Villa in January 2019, after recently being included in newly appointed Louis Carder Walcott's management team.

References

External links

1980 births
Living people
Footballers from the London Borough of Brent
English footballers
Association football midfielders
Luton Town F.C. players
Chelmsford City F.C. players
Stevenage F.C. players
Hitchin Town F.C. players
Chesham United F.C. players
Staines Town F.C. players
St Albans City F.C. players
Metropolitan Police F.C. players
Chipstead F.C. players
Wingate & Finchley F.C. players
Walton & Hersham F.C. players
Walton Casuals F.C. players
English Football League players
Isthmian League players
Westfield F.C. (Surrey) players
Black British sportspeople